Sir Henry John Wrixon  (18 October 1839 – 9 April 1913) was an Australian barrister and politician.

Early life
Wrixon was born in Dublin, Ireland, the son of Arthur Nicholas Wrixon, later a county court judge in Victoria, Australia, and his wife, Charlotte Matilda (daughter of Captain William Bace who fought under Wellington). Wrixon came to Victoria with his father in 1850, was educated in Portland, Victoria, entered the University of Melbourne in its inaugural year of 1855, and became one of the earliest students to matriculate there. In 1857 he returned to Ireland and entered Trinity College Dublin, graduating with a BA in 1861; the same year was called to the Irish Bar.

Career
Wrixon returned to Victoria in 1863 and practised with success as a barrister. After an unsuccessful attempt in 1864, Wrixon was elected to the Victorian Legislative Assembly for Belfast on 20 February 1868. In April 1870 Wrixon became Solicitor-General in the third McCulloch ministry, holding this position until the ministry resigned in June 1871. He was not a candidate at the 1877 election and soon afterwards went for a prolonged tour in Europe. Returning to Victoria he was elected for Portland in 1880, and held this seat for 14 years. He made a most effective speech on the reform bill brought in by James Service in 1880, but during the following stormy years there was little opportunity for a man of Wrixon's moderate views to become prominent. In February 1886, however, when the Gillies ministry was formed, he was given the portfolio of Attorney-General and showed great ability in piloting bills through the house.

Wrixon showed sincerity, tactfulness, good judgment and persuasiveness in dealing with opposition, and was always ready to accept amendments which would improve bills. In 1890 Wrixon went to London to represent the Victorian government in the Ah Toy case, which turned on the power of the colonies to refuse to admit aliens. He had argued the case before the Victorian full court when five judges decided against the government, with Higinbotham and Kerford dissenting. Wrixon succeeded in getting the judgment reversed by the privy council. In 1890 he became a Q.C., and in November of that year resigned with his colleagues in the Gillies government. In 1891 he was one of the Victorian representatives at the federal convention held at Sydney. There his speech on the Commonwealth bill was "specially remarkable for the almost prophetic insight into the modifications that would be necessary before the bill could be wholly acceptable" (Quick and Garran, The Annotated Constitution of the Australian Commonwealth, p. 136).

In 1892 Wrixon was a candidate for the Victorian speakership, but was defeated by a combination of the supporters of the opposing candidates, and Thomas Bent was elected. Two years later he resigned his seat in the assembly and in 1896 was elected a member of the legislative council for South Western Province. At the election of Victorian representatives for the 1897 federal convention he was not on the Age ticket, and just failed to be elected, being eleventh on the poll. He was elected President of the Victorian Legislative Council in 1901 and held the position until his retirement in 1910. Wrixon died at Melbourne on 9 April 1913.

Legacy
Wrixon married Charlotte, daughter of the Hon Henry Miller, and wealthy widow of M. W. Anderson on 17 December 1872, who survived him with two sons and a daughter. He was created K.C.M.G. in 1892. Wrixon was the author of Socialism being Notes on a Political Tour (1896), Jacob Shumate; or the People's March, a political novel (1903), (largely rewritten and issued as Edward Fairlie Frankfort; or Politics among the People, in 1912), The Pattern Nation, a dispassionate review of the trend towards socialism, but written from a conservative aspect (1906), The Religion of the Common Man (1909).

Wrixon was vice-chancellor of the University of Melbourne from 1897 to 1910, was appointed a trustee of the public library, museums and national gallery in 1902, and was elected vice-president of the trustees in 1905.

References 

 

1839 births
1913 deaths
Australian Roman Catholics
Australian federationists
Irish emigrants to colonial Australia
Knights Commander of the Order of St Michael and St George
Members of the Victorian Legislative Assembly
Members of the Victorian Legislative Council
Presidents of the Victorian Legislative Council
Attorneys-General of the Colony of Victoria
Solicitors-General of Victoria
19th-century King's Counsel
Melbourne Law School alumni
Vice-Chancellors of the University of Melbourne
Alumni of Trinity College Dublin
Australian male novelists
Australian King's Counsel